Genicanthus is a genus of marine angelfishes in the family Pomacanthidae.  Known commonly as swallowtail or lyretail angelfish, these fishes are so-named for the distinctive shape of their tailfins. This genus of angels, in comparison to the other species found in hobby aquaria, are a good choice for beginners as they do not get nearly as large as some of the others. Another unique attribute is that swallowtail angels will tolerate each other and can be kept in pairs or as a single male with a harem, though it is typically best to add them to a tank at the same time. If added on by one, the angel which is added first may become aggressively territorial towards any new additions. Unlike others in the family Pomocanthidae, the angelfish species in the genus Genicanthus are generally considered to be reef safe. Also unlike most other members of the Pomacanthidae, those in Genicanthus are sexually dimorphic, meaning males and females are easily distinguishable.  Fish in this species possess a small mouth relative to its size. This small mouth is well adapted for feeding on plankton in the water column.  As planktivores, members of Genicanthus generally will not nip corals and sessile invertebrates.

The name of this genus means “thorn cheek”, a reference to the spines on the rear margin of the operculum, a feature common to all angelfish.

Species
The following species are classified under the genus Genicanthus:

References 

Pomacanthidae
Marine fish genera
Taxa named by Bernard Germain de Lacépède